Alpha Microscopii (α Microscopii) is a star in the southern constellation of Microscopium. It is visible to the naked eye with an apparent visual magnitude of 4.89. The star is moving nearer to the Sun with a heliocentric radial velocity of 

This is an evolved giant star of type G with a stellar classification of either G7 III or G8 III depending on the source. At the age of 400 million years, it has an estimated 3.19 times the mass of the Sun and has expanded to 18.4 times the Sun's radius.

This star has an optical visual companion, CCDM J20500-3347B, of apparent visual magnitude 10.0 approximately 20.4 arcseconds away at a position angle of 166°. It has no physical connection to the star described above. As for Alpha Microscopii, it was found to be a probable spectroscopic binary in 2014.

References

Microscopium
G-type giants
Microscopii, Alpha
198232
102831
CD-34 14660
Double stars
7965
Microscopii, 27
Spectroscopic binaries